Stefan Dimitrov may refer to:
 Stefan Dimitrov (bass) (1939–2004), Bulgarian basso opera singer
 Stefan Dimitrov (footballer) (born 1984), Bulgarian footballer
 Stefan Dimitrov (volleyball) (born 1956), Bulgarian former volleyball player
 Stefan Dimitrov (weightlifter) (1957–2011), Bulgarian weightlifter
 Stefan Dimitrov (revolutionary), Bulgarian revolutionary, see Ivan Naumov